Aleksey Mikhailovich Igudesman (born 22 February 1973) is a Russian-German violinist, composer, conductor, comedian and actor. He performs in the comedy-musical duo Igudesman & Joo.

Biography 
Igudesman was born in Leningrad, in what was then the Soviet Union, to a musical Jewish family. At the age of 6 he and his family immigrated to Germany. At the age of 12 he was accepted at the Yehudi Menuhin School in England. From 1989 to 1998 he studied violin with Boris Kuschnir at the Vienna Conservatory.

Igudesman has several books published by Universal Edition, including Style Workout, The Catscratchbook and Pigs Can Fly, as well as violin duet books Klezmer & More, Celtic & More, Latin & More and Asia & More.

In a project named Violins of the World, Igudesman has performed his violin duets with Gidon Kremer, Julian Rachlin, Janine Jansen, Vadim Repin, Pavel Vernikov and Alexandra Soumm. Igudesman's poems have been recited by Roger Moore. With his string trio Triology, he has given concerts all over the world, as well as recording several CDs for Sony BMG.

Igudesman tours with pianist Hyung-ki Joo as the music and comedy duo Igudesman & Joo.

Igudesman is also an actor and film director. His directing debut , a feature-length mockumentary about classical musicians such as Julian Rachlin and Mischa Maisky and actors John Malkovich and Roger Moore, premiered at the Transylvanian International Film Festival in Romania in June 2012, and won "Most Entertaining Documentary" at DocMiami 2012 and has had a cinematic release in Germany.

He is a co-founder of Music Traveler which provides an app to search and book practice rooms. Music Traveler has several notable musicians as ambassadors; Billy Joel, Hans Zimmer, John Malkovich, Sean Lennon, Adrien Brody are their chief ambassadors.

Discography 
 1998: Triology – Triology Plays Ennio Morricone
 1999: Triology – Who Killed the Viola Player?
 2003: Triology – Around The World in 77 Minutes
 2015: Aleksey Igudesman – Fasten Seat Belts
 2016: Igudesman & Joo – You Just Have to Laugh

References

External links 

German classical violinists
Male classical violinists
1973 births
German Jews
Living people
German composers
German male composers
People educated at Yehudi Menuhin School
Soviet emigrants to Germany
21st-century classical violinists
21st-century German male musicians